Will Matthews may refer to:

Will Matthews (rugby union) (born 1985), rugby union player
Will Matthews (rugby league) (born 1988), rugby league player for the Gold Coast Titans
Will Matthews (American football), American football player, see 2006 Detroit Lions season

See also
William Matthews (disambiguation)